Wolfgang Klinger (born 10 May 1959) is an Austrian politician who has been a Member of the National Council for the Freedom Party of Austria (FPÖ) since 2016.

References

1959 births
Living people
Members of the National Council (Austria)
Freedom Party of Austria politicians